Lot 61 is a township in Kings County, Prince Edward Island, Canada.  It is part of St. Andrew's Parish. Lot 61 was awarded to Richard Cumberland in the 1767 land lottery. It was sold to Laurence Sullivan in 1783.

References

61
Geography of Kings County, Prince Edward Island